Tillandsia ponderosa is a species of flowering plant in the genus Tillandsia. This species is native to Mexico, Guatemala, El Salvador, and Honduras.

References

ponderosa
Flora of Mexico
Flora of Central America
Plants described in 1945